The 1911–12 season was Blackpool F.C.'s 15th season (12th consecutive) in the Football League. They competed in the twenty-team Division Two, then the second tier of English football, finishing fourteenth.

Arthur Wolstenholme was the club's top scorer, with ten goals (nine in the league and one in the FA Cup).

Season synopsis
Inconsistency throughout Blackpool's league season saw three straight defeats in their second, third and fourth outings, followed by three victories. Four defeats in a row occurred between 10 February and 2 March, with only one goal scored in their favour.

After two first-round replays against Crewe Alexandra (the first being abandoned after 61 minutes) in the FA Cup, Blackpool were knocked out at Bolton Wanderers in round two.

Table

Player statistics

Appearances

League
Fiske – 32
Crewdson – 35
Gladwin – 26
Thorpe – 38
Connor – 38
Evans – 18
Morley – 21
Wolstenholme – 31
Milne – 21
Metcalfe – 3
Nesbitt – 12
Cahill – 21
Clarke, W – 6
Owen – 2
Quinn – 27
Dale – 14
Downhall – 1
Cowie – 3
Dollins – 5
Cox – 15
Bradshaw – 17
Kidd – 6
Bainbridge – 10
Clarke, T – 2
Mitchell – 3
Wilson – 9
Spencer – 1
Howard – 1

Players used: 28

FA Cup
Fiske – 2
Crewdson – 4
Gladwin – 4
Thorpe – 4
Connor – 4
Morley – 2
Wolstenholme – 2
Milne – 1
Cahill – 4
Clarke, W – 1
Quinn – 3
Cowie – 2
Cox – 3
Bradshaw – 4
Kidd – 2
Bainbridge – 2

Players used: 16

Goals

League
Wolstenholme – 9
Milne – 6
Morley – 4
Nesbitt – 4
Quinn – 3
Connor – 2
Clarke, W – 1
Thorpe – 1
Wilson – 1

League goals scored: 31 (plus one own-goal)

FA Cup
Bainbridge – 1
Cowie – 1
Milne – 1
Quinn – 1
Wolstenholme – 1

FA Cup goals scored: 5

Transfers

In

Out

Notes

References

Blackpool F.C.
Blackpool F.C. seasons